Amata burtti is a moth of the subfamily Arctiinae. It was described by William Lucas Distant in 1900. It is found in Tanzania.

References

 

Endemic fauna of Tanzania
burtti
Moths described in 1900
Moths of Africa